The 5th Minnesota Infantry Regiment was a Minnesota USV infantry regiment that served in the Union Army in the Western Theater of the American Civil War.

Service

On October 23, 1861, Assistant Secretary of War Thomas A. Scott sent correspondence to Minnesota Governor Alexander Ramsey, authorizing him to raise a fifth regiment of infantry in the state. The 5th Minnesota Infantry Regiment was mustered into Federal service at Fort Snelling, Minnesota, between March 15 and April 30, 1862.  The Regiment was split with B Company posted to Fort Ridgely, C Company to  Fort Ripley, D Company to Fort Abercrombie, with the remainder heading off to fight the south.  B Co. was the escort that took the women, children and elderly to Fort Snelling from the Yellow Medicine Lower Sioux Agency in November 1862.  Companies B, C, and D were relieved and sent south in November- December that year.  The 5th Minnesota took part in the following:

 Siege of Corinth, May 26–30, 1862 (Companies A, E-K)
 Farmington, Mississippi, May 28, 1862 (Companies A, E-K)
 Battle of Redwood Ferry, Aug 18, 1862 (Company B, Dakota Conflict)
 Battle of Fort Ridgely, August 20–22, 1862 (Companies B & C, Dakota Conflict)
 Fort Abercrombie, Dakota Territory, September 3–6, 1862 (Company D, Dakota Conflict)
 Iuka, Mississippi, September 19, 1862 (Companies A, E-K present, but in reserve)
 Corinth, Mississippi, October 4, 1862 (Companies A, E-K)
 Mississippi Springs, Mississippi, May 13, 1863 (5th Regiment from here on)
 Jackson, Mississippi, May 14, 1863
 Assault on Vicksburg, May 22, 1863
 Satartia, Mississippi, June 4, 1863
 Mechanicsburg, Mississippi, June 6, 1863
 Richmond, Louisiana, June 14, 1863
 Canton, Mississippi, October 16, 1863
 Brownsville, Mississippi, October 18, 1863
 Barton's Station, Mississippi, October 20, 1863
 Assault on Fort De Russy, Louisiana, March 14, 1864
 Henderson's Hill, Louisiana,  March 21, 1864
 Grand Ecore, Louisiana, April 2, 1864
 Campti, Louisiana, April 3, 1864
 Pleasant Hill, Louisiana, April 9, 1864
 Cloutierville, Louisiana, April 23, 1864
 Cane River, Louisiana, April 24, 1864
 Moore's Plantation, Louisiana, May 3, 1864
 Bayou La Moure, Louisiana, May 6 and 7, 1864
 Bayou Roberts, Louisiana, May 7, 1864
 Mansura, Louisiana, May 16, 1864
 Bayou De Glaise, Louisiana, May 18 and 19, 1864
 Lake Chicot, Arkansas, June 6, 1864
 Tupelo, Mississippi, July 14, 1864 (non-veterans only; veterans on furlough June 17-August 17, 1864)
 Oxford, Mississippi, August 21, 1864
 Abbeville, Mississippi, August 23, 1864
 Nashville, Tennessee, December 15 and 16, 1864
 Fish River, Alabama, March 24, 1865
 Capture of Spanish Fort, Alabama, April 8, 1865
 Fort Blakely, Alabama, April 9, 1865
 Garrison Duty at Montgomery, Selma, and Demopolis, Alabama, until August, 1865
    
The regiment was mustered out on September 6, 1865.

Casualties
The 5th Minnesota Infantry suffered 4 officers and 86 enlisted men killed in action or who later died of their wounds, plus another 4 officers and 175 enlisted men who died of disease, for a total of 269 
fatalities.

Colonels
 Colonel Rudolph von Borgesrode - April 30, 1862, to August 31, 1862.
 Colonel Lucius Frederick Hubbard - August 31, 1862, to September 6, 1865.

Other noted individuals
Thomas P. Gere, first lieutenant, Medal of Honor recipient
John Ireland Chaplain and Archbishop of St. Paul, Minnesota

References

Notes

See also
List of Minnesota Civil War Units

External links
 The Civil War Archive
 Minnesota in the Civil and Indian Wars 1861-1865, by Minnesota, Charles Eugene Flandrau
Minnesota and the Civil War

Units and formations of the Union Army from Minnesota
1862 establishments in Minnesota
Military units and formations established in 1862
Military units and formations disestablished in 1865